The 1966 DFB-Pokal Final decided the winner of the 1965–66 DFB-Pokal, the 23rd season of Germany's knockout football cup competition. It was played on 4 June 1966 at the Waldstadion in Frankfurt. Bayern Munich won the match 4–2 against Meidericher SV, to claim their 2nd cup title.

Route to the final
The DFB-Pokal began with 34 teams in a single-elimination knockout cup competition. There were a total of five rounds leading up to the final. In the qualification round, all but four teams were given a bye. Teams were drawn against each other, and the winner after 90 minutes would advance. If still tied, 30 minutes of extra time was played. If the score was still level, a replay would take place at the original away team's stadium. If still level after 90 minutes, 30 minutes of extra time was played. If the score was still level, a drawing of lots would decide who would advance to the next round.

Note: In all results below, the score of the finalist is given first (H: home; A: away).

Match

Details

References

External links
 Match report at kicker.de 
 Match report at WorldFootball.net
 Match report at Fussballdaten.de 

MSV Duisburg matches
FC Bayern Munich matches
1965–66 in German football cups
1966
Football in Frankfurt
Sports competitions in Frankfurt
June 1966 sports events in Europe
1960s in Frankfurt